Mostafa Saadeq Al-Rafe' (1 January 1880 – May 1937) was an Egyptian poet, born in Egypt in Qalyubiyya, Egypt.

Early life
His maternal grandfather was Sheikh Eltoukhy (originally from Toukh, a famous Egyptian city) but was born in Aleppo and managed his business between The Levant and Egypt.

Mostafa Saadeq Al-Rafe' became deaf at the age of thirty.

Career
Despite his hearing disability and the fact that he was self-taught,  he became one of the most famous Arab poets of the early twentieth century. He composed the words of the Egyptian national anthem Eslami ya Misr, adopted between 1923 and 1936. The words of the Tunisian national anthem are largely the work of Al-Rafe'ie.

Works 
Some of the author's books and writings: 

1- "Wahy al-Qalam" is written by Mostafa Saadeq Al-Rafe'ie. "The book is composed of three parts, which are a collection of critical and constructive articles inspired by the contemporary social life and Islamic stories and history."

2- "Hadeeth Al Qamar" by Mostafa Saadeq Al Rafeie was first published in 1912.

3-"Al-Masakin" The Destitute, was first published in 1917.

References

1880 births
1937 deaths
Egyptian composers
20th-century Egyptian poets
National anthem writers
Egyptian male poets
20th-century male writers
Deaf poets